The European Patent Office Reports (EPOR) are a series of law reports, including decisions of the Boards of Appeal of the European Patent Office. The reports were published since 1979 and since at least 1989 by Sweet & Maxwell.

List of editions 

 European Patent Office, European Patent Office Reports 1986, ESC Pub.
 European Patent Office reports, Sweet & Maxwell, 1989, ISSN 0269-0802, 1989
 Brian C. Reid, Jessica Jones, Rory Sullivan, European Patent Office Reports 1997, Published 1998, Sweet & Maxwell Ltd, 
 Brian C. Reid, Jessica Jones, Rory Sullivan, European Patent Office Reports, 2000, Sweet & Maxwell, 
 Brian C. Reid, Jessica Jones, Rory Sullivan, European Patent Office Reports, 2001, Sweet & Maxwell Ltd, 
 By Brian C. Reid, Jessica Jones, European Patent Office Reports 2001, Published 2002, Sweet & Maxwell Ltd, 
 Peter Mclean Colley, European Patent Office Reports 2005, Published 2005, Sweet & Maxwell Ltd, 
 Peter Mclean Colley, European Patent Office Reports 2006: V. 21, Sweet & Maxwell Ltd,

See also 
 List of intellectual property law journals
 United States Patents Quarterly (USPQ)

References

European patent law
Case law reporters
Works about patent law